Eugenio Calabi (born 11 May 1923) is an Italian-born American mathematician and the Thomas A. Scott Professor of Mathematics, Emeritus, at the University of Pennsylvania, specializing in differential geometry, partial differential equations and their applications.

Academic career
Calabi was a Putnam Fellow as an undergraduate at the Massachusetts Institute of Technology in 1946. He received his PhD in mathematics from Princeton University in 1950 after completing a doctoral dissertation, titled "Isometric complex analytic imbedding of Kahler manifolds", under the supervision of Salomon Bochner. He later obtained a professorship at the University of Minnesota.
 
In 1964, Calabi joined the mathematics faculty at the University of Pennsylvania. Following the retirement of the German-born American mathematician Hans Rademacher, he was appointed to the Thomas A. Scott Professorship of Mathematics at the University of  Pennsylvania in 1967.  He won the Steele Prize from the American Mathematical Society (AMS) in 1991 for his work in differential geometry. In 1994, Calabi assumed emeritus status. In 2012 he became a fellow of the American Mathematical Society. In 2021, he was awarded Commander of the Order of Merit of the Italian Republic.

Research

Calabi has made a number of contributions to the field of differential geometry. Other contributions, not discussed here, include the construction of a holomorphic version of the long line with Maxwell Rosenlicht, a study of the moduli space of space forms, a characterization of when a metric can be found so that a given differential form is harmonic, and various works on affine geometry. In the comments on his collected works in 2021, Calabi cited his article Improper affine hyperspheres of convex type and a generalization of a theorem by K. Jörgens as that which he is "most proud of".

Kähler geometry
At the 1954 International Congress of Mathematicians, Calabi announced a theorem on how the Ricci curvature of a Kähler metric could be prescribed. He later found that his proof, via the method of continuity, was flawed, and the result became known as the Calabi conjecture. In 1957, Calabi published a paper in which the conjecture was stated as a proposition, but with an openly incomplete proof. He gave a complete proof that any solution of the problem must be uniquely defined, but was only able to reduce the problem of existence to the problem of establishing a priori estimates for certain partial differential equations. In the 1970s, Shing-Tung Yau began working on the Calabi conjecture, initially attempting to disprove it. After several years of work, he found a proof of the conjecture, and was able to establish several striking algebro-geometric consequences of its validity. As a particular case of the conjecture, Kähler metrics with zero Ricci curvature are established on a number of complex manifolds; these are now known as Calabi–Yau metrics. They have become significant in string theory research since the 1980s.

In 1982, Calabi introduced a geometric flow, now known as the Calabi flow, as a proposal for finding Kähler metrics of constant scalar curvature. More broadly, Calabi introduced the notion of an extremal Kähler metric, and established (among other results) that they provide strict global minima of the Calabi functional and that any constant scalar curvature metric is also a global minimum. Later, Calabi and Xiuxiong Chen made an extensive study of the metric introduced by Toshiki Mabuchi, and showed that the Calabi flow contracts the Mabuchi distance between any two Kähler metrics. Furthermore, they showed that the Mabuchi metric endows the space of Kähler metrics with the structure of a Alexandrov space of nonpositive curvature. The technical difficulty of their work is that geodesics in their infinite-dimensional context may have low differentiability.

A well-known construction of Calabi's puts complete Kähler metrics on the total spaces of hermitian vector bundles whose curvature is bounded below. In the case that the base is a complete Kähler–Einstein manifold and the vector bundle has rank one and constant curvature, one obtains a complete Kähler–Einstein metric on the total space. In the case of the cotangent bundle of a complex space form, one obtains a hyperkähler metric. The Eguchi–Hanson space is a special case of Calabi's construction.

Geometric analysis
Calabi found the Laplacian comparison theorem in Riemannian geometry, which relates the Laplace–Beltrami operator, as applied to the Riemannian distance function, to the Ricci curvature. The Riemannian distance function is generally not differentiable everywhere, which poses a difficulty in formulating a global version of the theorem. Calabi made use of a generalized notion of differential inequalities, predating the later viscosity solutions introduced by Michael Crandall and Pierre-Louis Lions. By extending the strong maximum principle of Eberhard Hopf to his notion of viscosity solutions, Calabi was able to use his Laplacian comparison theorem to extend recent results of Joseph Keller and Robert Osserman to Riemannian contexts. Further extensions, based on different uses of the maximum principle, were later found by Shiu-Yuen Cheng and Yau, among others.

In parallel to the classical Bernstein problem for minimal surfaces, Calabi considered the analogous problem for maximal surfaces, settling the question in low dimensions. An unconditional answer was found later by Cheng and Yau, making use of the Calabi trick that Calabi had pioneered to circumvent the non-differentiability of the Riemannian distance function. In analogous work, Calabi had earlier considered the convex solutions of the Monge–Ampère equation which are defined on all of Euclidean space and with 'right-hand side' equal to one. Konrad Jörgens had earlier studied this problem for functions of two variables, proving that any solution is a quadratic polynomial. By interpreting the problem as one of affine geometry, Calabi was able to apply his earlier work on the Laplacian comparison theorem to extend Jörgens' work to some higher dimensions. The problem was completely resolved later by Aleksei Pogorelov, and the result is commonly known as the Jörgens–Calabi–Pogorelov theorem.

Later, Calabi considered the problem of affine hyperspheres, first characterizing such surfaces as those for which the Legendre transform solves a certain Monge–Ampère equation. By adapting his earlier methods in extending Jörgens' theorem, Calabi was able to classify the complete affine elliptic hyperspheres. Further results were later obtained by Cheng and Yau.

Differential geometry
Calabi and Beno Eckmann discovered the Calabi–Eckmann manifold in 1953. It is notable as a simply-connected complex manifold which does not admit any Kähler metrics.

Inspired by recent work of Kunihiko Kodaira, Calabi and Edoardo Vesentini considered the infinitesimal rigidity of compact holomorphic quotients of Cartan domains. Making use of the Bochner technique and Kodaira's developments of sheaf cohomology, they proved the rigidity of higher-dimensional cases. Their work was an influence on the later work of George Mostow and Grigori Margulis, who established their global rigidity results out of attempts to understand infinitesimal rigidity results such as Calabi and Vesentini's, along with related works by Atle Selberg and André Weil.

Calabi and Lawrence Markus considered the problem of space forms of positive curvature in Lorentzian geometry. Their results, which Joseph Wolf considered "very surprising", assert that the fundamental group must be finite, and that the corresponding group of isometries of de Sitter spacetime (under an orientability condition) will act faithfully by isometries on an equatorial sphere. As such, their space form problem reduces to the problem of Riemannian space forms of positive curvature.

Work of John Nash in the 1950s considered the problem of isometric embeddings. His work showed that such embeddings are very flexible and deformable. In his PhD thesis, Calabi had previously considered the special case of holomorphic isometric embeddings into complex-geometric space forms. A striking result of his shows that such embeddings are completely determined by the intrinsic geometry and the curvature of the space form in question. Moreover, he was able to study the problem of existence via his introduction of the diastatic function, which is a locally defined function built from Kähler potentials and which mimics the Riemannian distance function. Calabi proved that a holomorphic isometric embedding must preserve the diastatic function. As a consequence, he was able to obtain a criterion for local existence of holomorphic isometric embeddings.

Later, Calabi studied the two-dimensional minimal surfaces (of high codimension) in round spheres. He proved that the area of topologically spherical minimal surfaces can only take on a discrete set of values, and that the surfaces themselves are classified by rational curves in a certain hermitian symmetric space.

Publications
Calabi is the author of fewer than fifty research articles. A large proportion of them have become a major part of the research literature.

Calabi's collected works were published in 2021:

Further reading

References

1923 births
Living people
Scientists from Milan
20th-century American mathematicians
21st-century American mathematicians
Italian emigrants to the United States
Differential geometers
Putnam Fellows
Fellows of the American Mathematical Society
Institute for Advanced Study visiting scholars
Members of the United States National Academy of Sciences
Princeton University alumni
University of Pennsylvania faculty
Mathematicians at the University of Pennsylvania
University of Minnesota faculty